World Wide Technology Raceway (formerly Gateway International Raceway and Gateway Motorsports Park) is a motorsport racing facility in Madison, Illinois, just east of St. Louis, Missouri, United States, close to the Gateway Arch. It features a  oval that hosts the NASCAR Cup Series, NASCAR Craftsman Truck Series, and the NTT IndyCar Series, a  infield road course used by SpeedTour TransAm, SCCA, and Porsche Club of America, a quarter-mile NHRA-sanctioned drag strip that hosts the annual NHRA Camping World Drag Racing Series Midwest Nationals event, and the Kartplex, a state-of-the-art karting facility.

The first major event held at the facility was the CART Series on Saturday May 24, 1997, the day before the Indy Racing League's Indianapolis 500. Rather than scheduling a race directly opposite the Indy 500 (as they had done in 1996 with the U.S. 500), CART scheduled Gateway the day before to serve as their Memorial Day weekend open-wheel alternative without direct conflict. For 2000, the race was moved to the fall. In 2001, it was dropped from the CART series schedule, and switched alliances to the Indy Racing League. After mediocre attendance, the event was dropped altogether after 2003. It was later re-added to the schedule for 2017.

In 1998, the then named Gateway International Raceway was purchased by Dover Motorsports, a group that also owned what is now Memphis International Raceway, along with the Nashville Superspeedway and Dover International Speedway. On November 3, 2010, Dover Motorsports closed the facility. On September 8, 2011, the facility was re-opened by local St. Louis real estate developer and former Indy Lights driver Curtis Francois and renamed Gateway Motorsports Park, saving the facility days before being scrapped. Under its new leadership, World Wide Technology Raceway went from the brink of demolition to one of the very few tracks in the United States to host the NASCAR Cup Series, NTT IndyCar Series, and NHRA Camping World Drag Racing Series all during the same year. The track also hosts Formula Drift, the Lucas Oil Drag Racing Series and the Confluence Music Festival.

Track History

Former Tracks 
St. Louis International Raceway was built in 1967 as a drag racing facility by Wayne and Ruth Meinert on property originally purchased by David Bergfield. Initially conceived as a 1/8-mile drag strip, the track was extended to a full 1/4-mile in 1971. Having been developed on dormant swampland that was long ago buried by the Mississippi River, the track soon adapted the nickname of "The Swamp". 

Throughout the 1970's, the raceway primarily held regional drag racing events. However, entering the early 1980's, the interest of adding a road racing circuit to the grounds began to mount, and in 1985 a road course was constructed by then-owner Jody Trover, featuring  and  configurations. The asphalt circuit had a  track width, 55 pit boxes within the  pit lane, and could officially hold 52,000 spectators. Parts of the existing drag strip were incorporated into the road course build. Coming into Turn 4 was a slight left-hander onto the drag strip's shutdown portion, and after snaking around the back half of the dragway, Turn 12 turned left onto the drag strip back towards the starting line to complete the lap. The course would welcome ARCA, IMSA, and the Trans-Am Series in its inaugural year. 

Also in 1985, a 1/20-mile quarter midget dirt track was established at the back right corner of the property when pulling into the facility.

In 1994, Chris Pook, promoter of the Grand Prix of Long Beach, acquired the facility for $21.5 million. The existing tracks were demolished over the course of 1995–1996 and a new oval speedway and drag strip were constructed at a cost of $25 million.

Current Tracks

The  oval is a favorite for many fans and racers alike due to the unique shape and different degrees of banking in each corner. The backstretch is confined to run parallel with Illinois Route 203, making Turns 1 & 2 a tighter radius than Turns 3 & 4. Turns 1 & 2 have similar characteristics to New Hampshire Motor Speedway while Turns 3 & 4 are similar to Phoenix Raceway. The track's egg shape mimics the legendary Darlington Raceway and Mobility Resort Motegi race tracks.

The infield of the oval track includes a road course that features a  configuration.

Race Lap Records
The fastest official race lap records at World Wide Technology Raceway (formerly St. Louis International Raceway) are listed as:

Timeline of Notable Events 

 On June 24 and June 25, 1972, Evel Knievel made a stop at the then-named St. Louis International Raceway for two motorcycle jumps. Arriving via his private plane that used the drag strip as a runway, he successfully jumped his Harley-Davidson XR-750 over 10 cars on both days.

 One of the last major events held on the original road course was Round 8 of the AMA Superbike Championship in 1995. Canadian Miguel Duhamel won the class in blistering hot conditions. The near triple-digit heat wave triggered local heat advisories which majorly impacted attendance.

 In 1997, CART, the NASCAR Busch Series, and the NHRA would all be newcomers to the revitalized Gateway International Raceway.
 Before the 1999 racing season, Gateway installed the now-named Wallace Grandstand in turns 1 & 2 of the oval track to increase seating capacity. The grandstand is named in honor of the Wallace family's trio of racing brothers who were born and raised in the St. Louis region—Rusty, Mike, and Kenny.

 In early January 2008, it was announced that the Missouri-Illinois Dodge Dealers would move their sponsorship from the NASCAR Craftsman Truck race to the NASCAR Nationwide Series race, and was called the Missouri-Illinois Dodge Dealers 250. At the 2008 event, Carl Edwards became the fourth driver to win two NASCAR Nationwide Series events at Gateway.

 2008 marked a big year for the NHRA Midwest Nationals event at Gateway as legendary 16-time Funny Car Champion John Force secured his 1,000th competitive round win by defeating Ron Capps in the first round. Force accomplished the feat on his 59th birthday, making the milestone doubly special.

 The 2008 NASCAR Camping World Truck Series race at Gateway was sponsored by Camping World, becoming the Camping World 200. Coincidentally, the race was won by defending Truck Series champion Ron Hornaday Jr. driving the No. 33 Camping World-sponsored truck for Kevin Harvick Inc.
 On the last lap of the July installment of the 2010 Nationwide Series race, during the height of their rivalry, Carl Edwards turned Brad Keselowski coming out of Turn 4 onto the front-stretch to take the checkered flag. Edwards was penalized 60 points and fined $25,000.

 In 2010, Gateway received a second Nationwide Series race due to the closure of Memphis Motorsports Park. The date was the former late fall event at Memphis. This was the last NASCAR event held at Gateway until 2014, as Dover Motorsports announced it would not seek sanctioning for the three events held at the track in 2010. The facility made no announcements concerning any of the other track's events. The former Nashville Superspeedway received Gateway's place on the schedule in July, while the race date for October would still be vacant. The NHRA also did not schedule any races at Gateway for its 2011 season.

 On November 3, 2010, Dover Motorsports announced that Gateway was officially closing and ceasing all racing operations. On September 8, 2011, it was officially announced that Gateway would re-open in 2012 and host the 15th AAA Insurance NHRA Midwest Nationals from September 28–30, under the leadership of Curtis Francois. On December 6, 2012, USAC announced that the track would have a USAC Traxxas Silver Crown Series date in 2013 on June 1.

 In February 2013, Francois announced the addition of Chris Blair as Executive Vice President and General Manager. Furthermore, plans were announced for the addition of a world class karting facility (which opened as the Gateway Kartplex in June 2014), an off-road venue (which opened in May 2015 with a TORC Series event) and a revitalization plan for the track's road course.

 On May 1, 2013, Curtis Francois finalized the purchase of Gateway Motorsports Park, officially making the facility locally owned and operated.

 On October 25, 2013, it was announced that the NASCAR Craftsman Truck Series would be returning to Gateway on June 14, 2014 for the first time since 2010. Bubba Wallace won the first NASCAR event under the track's new ownership.

 In October 2016, for the first time since the 2003 season, it was announced that the NTT IndyCar Series would be returning to Gateway on August 26, 2017 for the Bommarito Automotive Group 500. After IndyCar Series teams experienced issues with the surface during a May 2, 2017 open test on the oval, track officials undertook a multimillion-dollar renovation of the racing surface. The repaving project began June 19 and was completed in late July 2017.

 On April 17, 2019, World Wide Technology announced it had acquired naming rights for the track, renaming it to World Wide Technology Raceway.
 On June 26, 2019, a  configuration of the road course was completed that utilizes Turns 1 & 2 of the oval track. This added stretch of track was constructed directly in front of the Wallace Grandstand and its inception was partially created as a new course for Formula Drift and the SpeedTour TransAm Series.
 In late December of 2019, WWT Raceway purchased the adjacent Gateway National Golf Links, a 7,178-yard links-style golf course. “Boosting St. Louis and the Metro East is part of our mission and bringing together the two properties makes great sense,” Curtis Francois remarked. 

 On August 21, 2021, due to the outstanding success of the event, it was announced before the green flag of the Bommarito Automotive Group 500 that the NTT IndyCar Series would be returning to the track for a renewed five-year contract. The 2021 edition also saw former F1 competitor Romain Grosjean make his first ever career oval track start. His debut attempt would result in a respectable 14th place finish in the Dale Coyne Racing w/ Rick Ware Racing #51 Honda.

 On September 15, 2021, it was announced WWTR would be added to the NASCAR Cup Series schedule for the very first time for the 2022 season. Five thousand ticket deposits were placed within the first 24 hours of the announcement. The inaugural event was secured into the NASCAR Cup Series schedule for June 5th, 2022. On March 14, 2022, the Illinois Office of Tourism was announced as the official sponsor of the event, naming the race the Enjoy Illinois 300. On June 1, 2022, WWT Raceway officially announced a capacity crowd sellout for the event, a first in track history.
 Soon after being awarded a NASCAR Cup Series date for the 2022 season, Francois remarked another $40 million worth of upgrades will be dedicated to the facility. One of the first enhancements was extending the Steel And Foam Energy Reduction (SAFER) barriers down a large length of the oval track's backstretch wall. A request by NASCAR, this improvement meant the originally constructed "bump out" fencing down the back straightaway would be replaced with a swing gate, making the backstretch wall continuous. Other upgrades include a complete modernization of the oval track tower's rooftop and suites, addition of infield camping sites, rejuvenated team areas, and remodeling of concession and midway spaces. The projects will occur in phases and are scheduled for completion by early 2025.
 At the conclusion of qualifying for the 2022 edition of the Bommarito 500, Will Power earned his 67th IndyCar pole position, tying him for most all-time with the iconic Mario Andretti. Josef Newgarden won the main event for a remarkable third time in a row—fourth time overall.

Annual Events

Current Events 
 NASCAR Cup Series
 Enjoy Illinois 300 (2022)
 NASCAR Craftsman Truck Series
 Toyota 200 presented by CK Power (1998–2010, 2014–present)
 IndyCar Series
 Bommarito Automotive Group 500 (2001–2003, 2017–present)
 Indy Lights
 Mazda St. Louis Indy Lights Oval Challenge (1997–1998, 2000–2003, 2017–present)
 Indy Pro 2000 Championship
 St. Louis Pro Mazda Oval Challenge (2017–present)
 NHRA Camping World Drag Racing Series
 NHRA Midwest Nationals (1997–2010, 2012–present)
 NHRA Lucas Oil Drag Racing Series
Formula Drift (2018–present)
 USAC Silver Crown Champ Car Series (1997–2001, 2013–2014, 2016, 2022)

Future Events
 Trans-Am Series (1985, 2023)

Previous Events
 AMA Superbike Championship (1995)
 American Indycar Series (1988, 1990)
 Americas Rallycross Championship (2019)
 ARCA Midwest Tour
 Illinois Lottery 40 (2016–2017)
 ARCA Menards Series
 PapaNicholas Coffee 150 (1986, 1997, 2001, 2004–2007, 2018–2020)
 ARCA Menards Series East & West
 Monaco Cocktails Gateway Classic 125 (2018–2019)
 ARTGO Challenge Series (1997)
 ASA National Tour (2000)
 ASA Late Model Series (2008–2009)
 Atlantic Championship (1998–2000)
 Can-Am (1985–1986)
 NASCAR Xfinity Series
 5-Hour Energy 250 (1997–2010)
 NASCAR Autozone Elite Division – Midwest Series (1998–2003)
 NASCAR AutoZone Elite Division, Southeast Series (1999)
 TORC: The Off-Road Championship (2015)

Race History

NASCAR Cup Series results

NTT IndyCar Series results

NASCAR Xfinity Series results

NASCAR Craftsman Truck Series results

NHRA Camping World Drag Racing Series results

The 2004 event was marked by tragedy as Top Fuel driver Darrell Russell was killed in a second round crash. Russell had qualified at the No. 1 position for the second time in his career just the day before. One of the drag strip grandstands is named "The Darrell Russell Stand" in his memory.

Track Records 
 NASCAR Cup Series Qualifying:  Chase Briscoe, 32.528 s (138.342 mph), June 4, 2022
 NASCAR Cup Series Race:  Joey Logano, 3 h 7 min 34 s (97.965 mph), June 5, 2022
 NASCAR Nationwide Series Qualifying:  Brad Keselowski and  Reed Sorenson*, 33.158 s (135.714 mph), July 18, 2009
 NASCAR Nationwide Series Race:  Carl Edwards, 2 h 5 min 54 s (119.142 mph), July 29, 2006
 NASCAR Camping World Truck Series Qualifying:  Grant Enfinger, 32.405 s (138.867 mph), 2018
 NASCAR Camping World Truck Series Race:  Jack Sprague, 1 h 45 min 31 s
NHRA Camping World Drag Racing Series Fastest Speed:  Brittany Force (Top Fuel, 338.43 mph) October 2, 2022
 SCCA Formula Atlantic Overall:  Hans Peter, 53.635, March 29, 2008
 CART Championship Auto Racing Teams Race:  Juan Pablo Montoya, 1 h 55 min 38 s (155.519 mph), September 17, 2000
 IndyCar Single-Lap Record:  Will Power (189.709 mph) August 25, 2017
 IndyCar Two-lap Qualifying Average:  Will Power (189.642 mph) August 25, 2017

(*) Keselowski and Sorenson tied for the fastest lap time in qualifying, both setting a new identical track record. By virtue of being higher in owner's points, Keselowski was given the tiebreaker and credited with the pole.

Other Events
Metallica's Summer Sanitarium Tour made a stop at Gateway on July 3, 2000. Other artists featured at the concert were Korn, Kid Rock, Powerman 5000 & System of a Down.

The Illinois State Police uses Gateway to train new Troopers in high speed vehicle operations (Emergency Vehicle Operations Course).

During the winter months after the racing season concludes, World Wide Technology Raceway's oval track infield transforms into the WonderLight's drive-through Christmas light display.

See also
 List of NASCAR race tracks

Footnotes

References
 http://www.midiv.org/PDF/Track_Records/gir.pdf

External links
 
 High Resolution image from Google Maps
 Gateway International Raceway at NA-Motorsports
 St. Louis International Raceway at Ultimate Racing History
World Wide Technology Raceway at Gateway race results at Racing-Reference

NHRA Division 3 drag racing venues
Motorsport venues in Illinois
NASCAR tracks
ARCA Menards Series tracks
Champ Car circuits
IndyCar Series tracks
Sports in St. Louis
Sports in the Metro East
Buildings and structures in St. Clair County, Illinois